Rolf Turkka (30 August 1915, Lahti – 29 November 1989, Espoo; original surname Durchman) was a Finnish sailor who competed in the 1948 Summer Olympics and in the 1952 Summer Olympics.

References

1915 births
1989 deaths
Sportspeople from Lahti
People from Häme Province (Grand Duchy of Finland)
Finnish male sailors (sport)
Olympic sailors of Finland
Sailors at the 1948 Summer Olympics – 6 Metre
Sailors at the 1952 Summer Olympics – 6 Metre
Olympic bronze medalists for Finland
Olympic medalists in sailing
Medalists at the 1952 Summer Olympics